Humane law enforcement is the enforcement of laws relating to the humane treatment of non-human animals.

Agencies and personnel 

Humane law enforcement officers (oftentimes abbreviated as "HLEOs" in some jurisdictions) are generally members of a state or local society for the prevention of cruelty to animals (SPCA) or a state or local police department and as such are generally trained and certified alongside other police and law enforcement officers at a state or local police training academy.  Depending on the jurisdiction, HLEOs may also be sworn and/or commissioned officers with peace officer status, empowered with the appropriate law enforcement authority to effect arrests with or without warrant, sign complaints and issue court summonses, conduct searches and seizures, and carry weapons including a firearm, especially if trained and certified through a police training academy. Humane law enforcement may be performed by government agencies, private agencies, or both, depending on the jurisdiction. Individuals who perform humane law enforcement duties include police officers, humane law enforcement officers, animal control officers, and animal cruelty investigators.

There are many different agencies that are involved in humane law enforcement including private and public. One of the better known private agencies is the American Society for the Prevention of Cruelty to Animals. Other agencies include the Humane Society of the United States as well as state police departments. Although all the states do not have a specific humane law enforcement section of their police department, all of them do in one way or another take care of the responsibilities that humane officers would do.

Duties 

The duties of humane law enforcement personnel also depend on the jurisdiction. Their duties may include performing routine patrol to look out for violations of humane laws, answering complaints relating to violations of humane laws, making arrests or issuing summonses for violations of humane laws, and seizing animals due to violations of humane laws. They may also perform undercover work.

Although some of the duties may differ slightly between different jurisdictions and agencies, for the most part many of the responsibilities will be the same. According to criminologycareers.com, humane law enforcement officers are responsible for "Investigating animal abuse cases, Enforcing laws related to the care and keeping of animals, Regulating industries that work with and use animals, Writing reports, Preparing and executing warrants, Arresting suspected criminals, Issuing civil fines, Responding to calls for service." These duties are performed by all humane enforcement agencies while others may differ slightly depending on the location of the agency. For example, a humane law officer in New York City would most likely not be dealing with bear baiting offenders like officers in South Carolina do.

Education and training

Employment in humane law enforcement employment will at the very least require a high school diploma or GED. A great majority of the agencies and departments will also require previous experience working with animals. Those hoping to become a humane officer through a police department will also have to go through the police academy, because humane officers are fully empowered police officers. On top of these requirements, secondary training may be helpful, as officers work with sick/injured animals and need to know how to properly handle and care for them. "Individuals interested in becoming humane society police officers may obtain training through state humane society associations, national animal control associations, community colleges or technical schools."

See also 
 New Jersey Society for the Prevention of Cruelty to Animals

References 

Law enforcement
Animal welfare